Ostroróg  is a town in Szamotuły County, Greater Poland Voivodeship, Poland, with 1,993 inhabitants (2004).

History 
Ostroróg was first mentioned in 1383. It was granted town rights before 1412. There was a hospital in the town from 1472. The town's location was confirmed by the Polish king Sigismund I the Old in 1546. Ostroróg was a private town of Poland, until 1624 owned by the Ostroróg family. Jan Ostroróg, Polish Renaissance political writer and statesman, was born there in 1436. Jakub Ostroróg also owned property here in the 16th century. Between the 16th and 17th centuries it was an important centre of Polish Protestants. After 1624, it often changed owners, it was the property of Potocki, Rej, Górski, Radziwiłł, Zaleski, Malechowski, Sapieha and Kwilecki families. After the Partitions of Poland it was annexed by Prussia. It briefly returned to Polish rule in the years 1807-1815 as part of the Duchy of Warsaw, after which it was annexed again by Prussia, initially as part of the autonomous Grand Duchy of Poznan. During the Greater Poland Uprising, the town was taken over by its inhabitants, and as a result it returned to Poland, after the country regained independence in 1918.

Notable people
Jan Ostroróg (1436–1501), Polish Renaissance political writer and statesman
Andrzej Węgierski (1600–1649), Polish Calvinist historian, preacher and poet

References

Cities and towns in Greater Poland Voivodeship
Szamotuły County